The qualification for the 2018 European Women's Handball Championship:

Qualification system
France as host nation was directly qualified.
32 teams had registered for participation and compete for 15 places at the final tournament in two distinct Qualification Phases. The group winners of phase 1 advanced to phase 2. The 28 teams were divided into seven groups of four teams.

Qualification Phase 1
The groups were played in a tournament format from 9 to 11 June 2017. The group winners advanced to the second phase.

The draw was held on 20 March 2017.

All times are local.

Group A

Group B

Qualification Phase 2
The groups were played in a home and away round-robin format from September 2017 to June 2018. The top two teams qualified for the main tournament as well as the best-ranked third placed team, where the results against the last-placed team were revoked.

The draw was held on 21 April 2017.

Seeding

All times are local.

Group 1

Group 2

Group 3

Group 4

Group 5

Group 6

Group 7

Ranking of third-placed teams
To determine the best third-placed teams from the qualifying group stage which qualified directly for the final tournament, only the results against the first, and second-placed teams in their group were taken into account, while results against the fourth-placed team were not included. As a result, four matches played by each third-placed team counted for the purposes of determining the ranking.

References

External links
Eurohandball.com

Qualification
Europe Women's Championship qualification
Europe Women's Championship qualification